John Benton-Harris (born 28 September 1939) is an American photographer and educator.

Life and work
Benton-Harris was born in the Bronx, New York City. He worked as an industrial photographer with the Sinclair Oil Corporation for a period from 1961. He then completed mandatory military service as a photographer with the United States Army, in Italy. Afterwards he travelled in Europe, then in 1965 settled in London, working as a staff photographer for London Life magazine. He has since worked as a photojournalist for various newspapers and magazines.

In 1987/88 Benton-Harris was appointed adjunct Professor of Photography at the University of Michigan's School of Art.

Publications

Zines by Benton-Harris
The English. Southport: Café Royal, 2018. Edition of 250 copies.
Saint Patrick's People. Southport: Café Royal, 2019. Edition of 250 copies.
Children of the Troubles: Northern Ireland. Southport: Café Royal, 2020. Edition of 250 copies.
Walking New York 1961–1981. Southport: Café Royal, 2020. Edition of 250 copies.
Walking London 1965–1988. Southport: Café Royal, 2021.

Books edited with others
Through the Looking Glass: Photographic art in Britain 1945–1989. London: Barbican Art Gallery, 1989. Coedited by Benton-Harris and Gerry Badger. .

Exhibitions

Solo exhibitions
A Walk in New York, Impressions Gallery, York, UK, 1973
England, St Patrick's Day, Streets of NYC, The Photographers' Gallery, London, 1981/82

Group exhibitions
Summer Show 6: Old masters were young once, Serpentine Galleries, London, 1971. Benton-Harris' work was shown on its own in the Print room.
Two Views: Photographs of British Towns as Seen by Eight Photographers, The Photographers' Gallery, London, 1973. With work by Benton-Harris, Ian Berry, Colin Curwood, Chris Killip, Josef Koudelka, Ron McCormick, and Christine Pearcey.
The Portrait Season, Impressions Gallery, York, UK, 1985. With work by Benton-Harris, Clive Landen, and Philip Sayer.

Exhibitions co-curated by Benton-Harris
American Images: Photography 1945 to 1980, Barbican Art Gallery, London, 1985 and touring
Through the Looking Glass: Photographic Art in Britain 1945–1989, Barbican Art Gallery, London, 1989; Manchester City Art Gallery, 1989/90

Collections
Benton-Harris' work is held in the following permanent collections:
Arts Council Collection, UK: 80 prints (as of 28 September 2021)
Brooklyn Museum, Brooklyn, New York: 1 print (as of 28 September 2021)
Museum of Contemporary Photography, Chicago, Illinois: 2 prints (as of 28 September 2021)
National Portrait Gallery, London: 9 prints (as of 28 September 2021)

References

External links

University of Michigan faculty
Street photographers
American photojournalists
21st-century American photographers
20th-century American photographers
Photographers from the Bronx
Living people
1939 births